Ayalkkaari is a 1976 Indian Malayalam-language film,  directed by I. V. Sasi and produced by A. Raghunath. The film stars Jayabharathi, M. G. Soman, Rani Chandra and Vincent. The film has musical score by G. Devarajan.

Cast 

Jayabharathi as Geetha
M. G. Soman
Rani Chandra as Sathi
Vincent as Raju
Adoor Bhasi as Fernandez
Manavalan Joseph as Kurup
Prema
Sankaradi
Krishnan Munnadu
M. O. Devasya
Prathapachandran
Bahadoor as Varghese
E. Madhavan
Janardanan as Mathew
Meena as Flory
Ravikumar as Mohanan
Treesa
Usharani as Elizabeth

Soundtrack 
The music was composed by G. Devarajan and the lyrics were written by Sreekumaran Thampi.

References

External links 
 

1976 films
1970s Malayalam-language films
Films directed by I. V. Sasi